Tyler is a former settlement in Madera County, California. Tyler still appeared on maps as of 1918.

References

Former settlements in Madera County, California
Former populated places in California